Liu Wen may refer to:

 Liu Wen (model) (born 1988), Chinese model
 Liu Wen (doctor), one of the whistleblowers of the 2019-20 coronavirus outbreak